Benggoi is a language, or perhaps three languages, of Seram, Indonesia.

External links

Central Maluku languages
Languages of Indonesia
Seram Island